The Charles River Peninsula is a  nature preserve in Needham, Massachusetts owned and managed by the Trustees of Reservations.  The Charles River turns nearly 180 degrees, creating the peninsula.  A  field on the peninsula was farmed for roughly a century. The original acreage was given in 1960; additional land was given in 1994.

The property includes a loop hiking trail and a boat launch.

Gallery

References

The Trustees of Reservations
Open space reserves of Massachusetts
Protected areas of Norfolk County, Massachusetts
Peninsulas of Massachusetts
Landforms of Norfolk County, Massachusetts
Protected areas established in 1960
1960 establishments in Massachusetts